Matsuno (written:  lit. "pine field") is a Japanese surname. Notable people with the surname include:

, Japanese long-distance runner
, Japanese writer
, Japanese painter
Clara Matsuno (松 野 ク ラ ラ, born 1853), German educator in Japan
, Japanese politician
, Japanese politician
, Japanese politician
, Japanese idol
, Japanese badminton player
, Japanese voice actor
, Japanese politician
, Japanese video game designer

See also
, a town in Kitauwa District, Ehime Prefecture, Japan
, a dam in Mizunami, Gifu Prefecture, Japan

Japanese-language surnames